Central Methodist Episcopal Church may refer to:

Central Methodist Episcopal Church (Lansing, Michigan), listed on the National Register of Historic Places in Ingham County, Michigan
Central Methodist Episcopal Church (Sault Ste. Marie, Michigan), listed on the National Register of Historic Places in Chippewa County, Michigan